"Hello It's Me" is a song written by American musician Todd Rundgren. It was the first song he wrote, and was recorded by his group Nazz as a slow ballad, released as the B-side of the band's first single, "Open My Eyes", in 1968. A mid-tempo version of "Hello It's Me", recorded for Rundgren's 1972 solo album Something/Anything?, was issued as a single in 1973, reaching No. 5 on the Billboard Hot 100 chart.

History 
"Hello It's Me" was the first song written by Todd Rundgren. Written in 1967 as a slow ballad about the breakup of a relationship, it was released in October 1968 as the B-side of his band Nazz's debut single "Open My Eyes", and included on the debut album Nazz (1968). Although released as a B-side, it was picked up in preference to the A-side by Boston radio station WMEX, where it rose to No. 1, and was subsequently picked up by other stations. It entered the Billboard chart in February 1969, peaking at number 71, and re-entered the charts the following January, this time peaking at number 66. In Canada, it ranked number 41 in March 1969, and number 58 in February 1970.

Rundgren's songs in this early phase of his career were heavily influenced by the work of Laura Nyro, but in a 2005 interview he revealed that the basic structure of the song was adapted from the introduction of a Jimmy Smith recording:

Todd Rundgren solo version 

Rundgren recorded a more midtempo version of "Hello It's Me" for his 1972 solo album Something/Anything?  It was released twice as a single, with the second issue in 1973 becoming Rundgren's only top ten pop hit, reaching No. 5 on the Hot 100.  It also reached No. 17 on the Adult Contemporary chart.

Personnel
Todd Rundgren – lead vocals, piano
Mark "Moogy" Klingman – organ
John Siomos – drums
Stu Woods – bass guitar
Robbie Kogale – guitar
Randy Brecker – trumpet
Michael Brecker – tenor sax
Barry Rogers – trombone
Hope Ruff – backing vocals
Richard Corey – backing vocals
Allan Nicholls - backing vocals
Vicki Robinson – backing vocals
Dennis Cooley – backing vocals
Cecilia Norfleet – backing vocals

Chart history

Weekly charts

Year-end charts

Popular culture
In 2021 the song was used during a pivotal scene in the premiere episode of And Just Like That..., the TV sequel to the original Sex and the City on HBO. It was repeated at various points during the show's 2021-22 season.
 In the pilot of the Fox sitcom That '70s Show, the song was first mentioned by Jackie Burkhart and it also played over the ending scene in which Eric Forman and Donna Pinciotti were lying on the Vista Cruiser. In addition, the end credits featured Eric and the gang joyfully singing "Hello It's Me" in the car while on their way to a Todd Rundgren concert. This scene was used again during the end credits of the show's series finale.
 Paul Giamatti's character in the 2000 film Duets performs this song in a karaoke bar. 
 The single was used in a 2009 Tums advertisement.
 The song is used in the movie The Virgin Suicides.
 Rundgren's version is used in the 2011 movie Paul.
 Rundgren's version is used in a deleted scene of Guardians of the Galaxy Vol. 2.

Other versions
A cover version of "Hello It's Me" was recorded by The Isley Brothers for their 1974 album Live It Up.
A version influenced by the Isley Brothers' cover was recorded by Groove Theory for their 1995 self-titled album.
Mary J. Blige recorded a version produced by Mark Ronson that appears on the Japanese and iTunes editions of her 2007 album Growing Pains.
Matthew Sweet and Susanna Hoffs included their take of the song on their album Under the Covers, Vol. 2.
Todd Rundgren recorded a new "Latin" version in 1997 on his album With a Twist...
Erykah Badu recorded a version influenced by the Isley Brothers' cover on her 2015 mixtape But You Caint Use My Phone, as a duet with André 3000.

References

External links
 Todd Rundgren's "Hello, It's Me": Wild Success Story, Marc Nathan, August 13, 2015, Best Classic Bands

1968 songs
1968 singles
1973 singles
Bearsville Records singles
Todd Rundgren songs
The Isley Brothers songs
Songs written by Todd Rundgren
Song recordings produced by Todd Rundgren
American soul songs
American pop songs
Groove Theory songs